Carrbridge Packhorse Bridge, also known as Coffin Bridge, is a bridge in the village of Carrbridge in the Highlands of Scotland. The bridge was built in 1717 to allow funeral processions to reach Duthil Church by crossing the River Dulnain. The parapets were washed away in the 19th century. In 1971 the bridge became a Category B listed building. It is now a popular tourist attraction.

History

The packhorse bridge was constructed to allow funerals to proceed across the river to Duthil Church. Brigadier-General Alexander Grant commissioned the bridge. Stonemason John Niccelsone constructed the bridge at Lynne of Dalrachney and the £100 cost was paid for out of stipends of Duthil church. The bridge was completed in 1717 and floods in the 1829 (Muckle Spate) washed away the guard rails. The bridge also provided a way for Tradesmen and locals to cross the river. It is the Scottish Highlands oldest known stone bridge.

It was a listed as a scheduled monument on 29 December 1958 and subsequently de-scheduled on 5 April 2016. The bridge became a Category B listed building on 5 October 1971.

Description
The bridge at the village of Carrbridge is a popular tourist attraction and it is located in the Cairngorms mountain area of Scotland. It has also been described as the coffin bridge. All that exists today is a slender arch across the River Dulnain.

It is described in the Category B listing as a "High single span humpback rubble bridge; tooled rubble arch ring springing from natural rock abutment; neither surfacing nor parapet survive."

See also
List of bridges in the United Kingdom

Gallery

References

External links
YouTube - Remarkable Old Bridge in Carrbridge in the Highlands of Scotland-Still standing today
YouTube -  The river Dulnain in spate, Carrbridge

Bridges completed in the 18th century
Category B listed buildings in Scotland
Bridges in Scotland
1717 establishments in Great Britain
Packhorse bridges
Stone bridges in Scotland